In linguistics, meronymy is a semantic relation between a meronym denoting a part and a holonym denoting a whole. In simpler terms, a meronym is in a part-of relationship with its holonym. For example, finger is a meronym of hand, which is its holonym. Similarly, engine is a meronym of car, which is its holonym.

Holonymy is the converse of meronymy.

A closely related concept is that of mereology, which specifically deals with part–whole relations and is used in logic. It is formally expressed in terms of first-order logic. A meronymy can also be considered a partial order.

Meronym and holonym refer to part and whole respectively, which is not to be confused with hypernym which refers to type. For example, a holonym of leaf might be tree (a leaf is a part of a tree), whereas a hypernym of oak tree might be tree (an oak tree is a type of tree).

See also 
 Has-a
 Hyponymy and hypernymy
 Is-a
 Mereological nihilism
 Synecdoche

References 

Semantic relations